Unlike in the Parliament at Westminster where there is an Official Opposition to the government of the day, all parties in the Scottish Parliament that are not in government are all technically on the same footing as 'opposition parties'. With the Scottish National Party (SNP) currently in government, the Scottish Conservatives and Scottish Labour each have a Shadow Cabinet composed of Members of the Scottish Parliament (MSPs) and prospective parliamentary candidates.

Shadow Cabinet ministers have a responsibility to shadow an individual government minister or a specific area of government. Other parties have frontbench teams with spokespersons covering multiple areas of government or which are composed of spokespersons from both within and outwith the Scottish Parliament.

Conservative Shadow Cabinets

Current Shadow Cabinet

Previous Shadow Cabinets

Labour Shadow Cabinets

Current Shadow Cabinet

Previous Shadow Cabinets

Scottish Greens Shadow Cabinet

Liberal Democrat Shadow Cabinet

See also

 Leader of the Opposition (Scotland), for the informal role

Notes

References

External links
 
 Conservative Shadow Cabinet - 
 Labour Shadow Cabinet - New Scottish shadow cabinet in full
 Scottish Greens Spokespeople - Holyrood Candidates
 Lib Dem Spokespeople - Our Team

Scottish Parliament
Politics of Scotland
British shadow cabinets
Shadow cabinets